Toyosato Station (豊郷駅) is the name of two train stations in Japan:

 Toyosato Station (Hokkaidō)
 Toyosato Station (Shiga)